The Tennessee Rambers were an American Country and Western swing band that originally consisted of Dick Hartman (1898–1962) on mandolin and vocals, Harry Blair on guitar and vocals, Kenneth Wolfe on fiddle, and Cecil Campbell on banjo and steel guitar.  Hartman formed the band in 1928 to perform on Pittsburgh radio station KDKA.  In 1934, the band moved to Charlotte, North Carolina, which remained their base for most of the band's lifespan. While in Charlotte, the group played on WBT.

By the time the Tennessee Ramblers made their first recording for Bluebird Records in 1935, they had added bassist Fred Morris, fiddler Elmer Warren, and a novelty musician named Jack Gillette.  The band performed in the 1936 motion picture Ride Ranger Ride and the 1937 film The Yodelin' Kid from Pine Ridge, both starring Gene Autry.  Although Hartman left the group in 1938, the band continued performing under the leadership of Gillette.  They appeared in several films in the early 1940s, including Tex Ritter's The Pioneers in 1941.

In 1949, Harry Blair retired, leaving Campbell as the last remaining original member.  Campbell continued using the band's name, however, until the 1980s.

References

External links
Tennessee Ramblers — entry at CountryWorks.com

Country music groups from North Carolina